Copper is one of the world's most important industrial minerals, and Africa is an important world producer.  While output is traditionally dominated by Zambia, South Africa and Katanga Province in the south of the Democratic Republic of the Congo, many African nations contribute to copper production, and many African nations have undeveloped ore resources.

Cobalt, another important industrial metal, is often mined in conjunction with copper.

Botswana 
 Dukwi, African Copper's  mine
 Ghanzi, Hana Mining; also silver.

Democratic Republic of the Congo

Katanga Province

Namibia

Weatherly (formerly Ongopolo Mining and Processing) – Matchless Mine Western Extension and Otjihase Mine near Windhoek

South Africa
 Palabora Mining Company
 Rio Tinto

Uganda
Kasese - Kilembe Mines
Jinja – Kilembe smelting operations currently reopening under A-Tec Mining after 1975 nationalization

Zambia

 The Copperbelt
 Copperbelt Province
 Lumwana – Equinox Minerals
 Nchanga Mines
 Luanshya Copper Mine Company – Baluba – Mulyashi copper project 	  
 Mkushi – African Eagle Resources

 Zambia Consolidated Copper Mines
 Zambia Copper Investments Limited – Konkola Deep Mining Project – symbol ZCI on the Johannesburg Securities Exchange

See also 
 Copper extraction techniques
 List of countries by copper mine production
 Mineral industry of Africa
 Economy of Zambia
 Aluminium in Africa
Cement in Africa
 Iron ore in Africa
 Platinum in Africa
 Titanium in Africa

References

External links 
Copper Development Association Africa
 Journal: Mining Review Africa
 MiningTopNews

 
Africa
Mining in Africa
Natural resources in Africa